The 2010 World U-17 Hockey Challenge was an international ice hockey tournament held in Timmins, Iroquois Falls, Cochrane / Kapuskasing, Kirkland Lake, New Liskeard, Ontario, Canada between December 28, 2009 and January 4, 2010. The venues used for the tournament included the McIntyre Arena in Timmins, Jus Jordan Arena in Iroquois Falls, Tim Horton Arena in Cochrane, the Kapuskasing Sports Palace in Kapuskasing, Joe Mavrinac Community Complex in Kirkland Lake, and the New Liskeard Arena in New Liskeard. The United States won its third title, defeating Canada Ontario 2-1 in the gold-medal game.

Participating teams 

Canada entered five regional teams from across the country.  These teams were:
  Atlantic (New Brunswick, Newfoundland, Nova Scotia and Prince Edward Island)
  Quebec
  Ontario
  Western (Manitoba and Saskatchewan)
  Pacific (Alberta and British Columbia)

International teams were:

Challenge results

Preliminary round

Group A

Results

Group B

Results

Final round

* Decided in overtime.

Semifinals

9th place game

7th place game

5th place game

Bronze medal game

Gold medal game

Scoring leaders

Goaltender leaders
(Minimum 60 Minutes Played)

Final standings

References

Sources 
 http://www.hockeycanada.ca/index.php/ci_id/60832/ss_id/24850/la_id/1.htm

External links
Official website

U-17
U-17
U-17
U-17
U-17
U-17
World U-17 Hockey Challenge
Ice hockey competitions in Ontario
International ice hockey competitions hosted by Canada